Khovansky (masculine), Khovanskaya (feminine), or Khovanskoye (neuter) may refer to:
Khovansky (surname)
Khovansky (inhabited locality) (Khovanskoye), name of several rural localities in Russia

See also
 Khovanshchina, an opera by Modest Mussorgsky
 Khovanshchina (film), a 1960 film of the opera